The riders were divided into two categories: the national teams and the touriste-routiers. There were four big national teams with 10 cyclists each: the Belgian team, the German team, the Spanish/Luxembourgian team and the French team. There were also five small teams of 4 cyclists each: the Swiss team, the Dutch team, the Yugoslavian team, the Romanian team and the Austrian team. For the Dutch, Yugoslavian and Romanian teams, it was the first participation ever. The Italian team was absent for political reasons (the Second Italo-Abyssinian War). An Italian team consisting of Italians living in France had been allowed to the race and even had jersey numbers designated, but finally the Tour organisers changed their minds.

By team

By rider

By nationality

References

1936 Tour de France
1936